State Route 245 (SR 245) is a north–south state highway in the U.S. state of California that runs from near Exeter to near Kings Canyon National Park. It connects State Route 198 in Tulare County to State Route 180 in Fresno County.  It runs through the city of Woodlake and the small unincorporated towns of Elderwood, Badger, and Pinehurst.  Roughly 95 percent of its  length traverses rural areas.  It was formerly numbered State Route 69.  North of Avenue 364 (Tulare County), State Route 245 is synonymous with Millwood Drive.

Route description
The route begins at State Route 198 in Tulare County. It then heads north and intersects State Route 216 in Woodlake and County Route J27 amid farmland in the county. The route continues to meet State Route 201 in Elderwood. After several miles through Tulare County, it crosses into Fresno County, where it meets its north end at State Route 180.

SR 245 is not part of the National Highway System, a network of highways that are considered essential to the country's economy, defense, and mobility by the Federal Highway Administration.

History

The route was defined in the 1964 renumbering from Interstate 5 to SR 60 in the Los Angeles area. This route was deleted in 1965 and replaced the former deleted State Route 69 in 1972.

Major intersections

See also

References

External links

California @ AARoads.com – State Route 245
Caltrans: Route 245 highway conditions
California Highways: SR 245

245
State Route 245
State Route 245